The Piaggio P.32 was an Italian medium bomber of the late 1930s, produced by Piaggio, and designed by Giovanni Pegna. It was a modern design for its time, but was a failure due to lack of powerplants commensurate with its high wing loading.

Design
The P.32 was a twin-engine monoplane with a crew of five or six. The main structure was of wood, with a glazed nose, low cockpit, twin tailfins, and a distinct 'banana' shape to the fuselage. It was armed with a dorsal turret with two  machine guns, a ventral turret, a single machine gun in the nose, and it could carry a  bomb load.

Utilizing their experience of designing experimental and record-breaking aircraft like the Piaggio P.16, Piaggio P.23M, and Piaggio P.23R, Piaggio designed the P.32 with very small wings for its size. This meant a high wing loading, which required Handley-Page leading edge slats and double trailing-edge flaps to provide enough lift on takeoff and landing.

Development
The development of this aircraft began with the contest announced by the Regia Aeronautica (Italian Air Force) in 1934. The P.32 was one of many contenders, and the most modern.

The prototype first flew in 1936, and was tested at Guidonia, leading to an order for 12 aircraft, followed by a second order for five. These aircraft were fitted with the  Isotta Fraschini Asso XI.RC inline V-12 engines, and were designated the P.32 I.

In early 1937, the P.32 Is were assigned to XXXVII Gruppo BT, 18 Stormo. The advanced wing design meant that they could be flown only by specially trained crews, but the aircraft was found to be fatally underpowered, with a maximum speed of only , and then only with no bombs or defensive weapons carried. They were unable to fly on only one engine, and their handling qualities were inferior to the SM.79 and BR.20.

The P.32 II, fitted with more powerful  Piaggio P.XI R.C.40 radial engines was tested, and 12 were delivered in early 1938. The more powerful engines gave a better rate of climb, but the increased weight meant there was no improvement in maximum speed, while the range dropped from  because of higher fuel consumption.

However, the prototype crashed on 25 February 1938, killing the test pilot, leading to the cancellation of further development.

The P.32 Is and IIs were taken out of service in April 1938 and were used as training aircraft. In 1939, a P.32 crashed, killing the entire crew. There is no further information about the fate of the remaining aircraft, and most likely they were scrapped soon afterwards.

Variants
 P.32 I With  Isotta Fraschini Asso XI R.C. V-12 engines.
 P. 32 II With  Piaggio P.XI R.C.40 radial engines.
 Caproni Ca.405 Procellaria A version built by Caproni, with the wings of the P.32 and a new fuselage, specifically for the Istres-Damascus-Paris Air Race of 1937, but not completed in time. Two built, one with Isotta Fraschini Asso engines and one with Piaggio P.XI.R.C.40 engines.
 P.32 Bis A redesign built by Caproni-Reggiane (as the Ca.400). Tested with both types of engine. One prototype built.

Operators
 
 Regia Aeronautica

Specifications (P.32-I)

See also

References

Bibliography

Further reading

 Vigna Achille, Il Piaggio P.32, Storia Militare magazine n.100 November 1997 

P.032
1930s Italian bomber aircraft
Low-wing aircraft
World War II Italian bombers
Aircraft first flown in 1936
Twin piston-engined tractor aircraft